Sky and Water II is a lithograph print by the Dutch artist M. C. Escher first printed in 1938. It is similar to the woodcut Sky and Water I, which was first printed only months earlier.

See also
Tessellation

Sources
M. C. Escher—The Graphic Work; Taschen Publishers.
M. C. Escher—29 Master Prints; Harry N. Abrams, Inc., Publishers.

Works by M. C. Escher
1938 paintings
Fish in art
Birds in art

he:שמים ומים#שמים ומים 2